Kondapalli railway station (station code - KI) is an Indian Railways station in Kondapalli, Vijayawada of Andhra Pradesh. It lies on Kazipet - Vijayawada section of New Delhi - Chennai main line. It is administered under Vijayawada railway division of the South Central Railway zone. It is used as a satellite station to reduce congestion of the rail traffic on Vijayawada Junction.

Location 

This station is located in Kondapalli, industrial suburban of Vijayawada situated towards west side of the City. Localities like Ibrahimpatnam, Kondapalli, NTPS Vijayawada colonies(A, B, C Colonies) are accessible from this station.

Classification 
In terms of earnings and outward passengers handled, Kondapalli is categorized as a Non-Suburban Grade-6 (NSG-6) railway station. Based on the re–categorization of Indian Railway stations for the period of 2017–18 and 2022–23, an NSG–6 category station earns nearly  crore and handles close to  passengers.

Passenger MEMU & DEMU trains:

 Mahbubabad- Passenger
 Bhadrachalam- Passenger
 – Passenger
 – Passenger

See also 
List of railway stations in India

References

Railway stations in Krishna district
Vijayawada railway division